Salvia sonomensis (Sonoma sage, creeping sage) is a low-growing perennial plant that is endemic to California.

Description
The species is highly variable in leaf shape and size and in flower color. Leaves can be long and narrow, or shorter and rounded, with leaf color also showing a wide range from yellow-green to gray-green. Flowers can be pale lavender, lavender-purple, or lavender-blue.

Taxonomy
The specific epithet, sonomensis, refers to Sonoma County, California, one of the areas where it is found.

Distribution and habitat
S. sonomensis is found in three distinct areas in California: the California Coastal Range from Siskiyou to Napa county; from Monterey county to San Diego county; and in the Sierra Nevada foothills. It can be found growing under  elevation on dry hillsides and woodlands.

Cultivation
Salvia sonomensis is easy to grow in cultivation, except in heavy clay soils and where there is too much irrigation. There are several different varieties, based on the different leaf types and flower colors. Two particularly hardy selections that were chosen from higher elevations are 'Cone Peak' and 'Serra Peak'. 'John Farmar-Bowers' is a white flowered variety. There are also two hybrids that are believed to be a cross between S. sonomensis and S. mellifera: 'Dara's Choice' and 'Mrs. Beard'.

Stimulant use
According to Dale Pendell, in his book Pharmako/poeia, "Salvia sonomensis contains a camphorlike substance that is a mild stimulant when smoked."

Notes

References 
 Jepson Manual Treatment - Salvia sonomensis
 USDA Plants Profile; Salvia sonomensis
Salvia sonomensis - Photo gallery

sonomensis
Endemic flora of California
Natural history of the California chaparral and woodlands
Natural history of the California Coast Ranges
Flora of the Sierra Nevada (United States)
Garden plants of North America
Drought-tolerant plants
Groundcovers
Flora without expected TNC conservation status